Santoche is a former commune in the Doubs department in the Bourgogne-Franche-Comté region in eastern France. On 1 January 2017, it was merged into the new commune Pays-de-Clerval.

Geography

History
The commune has the only dolmen in the department and a rectangular mound surrounded by ditches called the Motte Jules César, which was once a Gallic temple.

Archaeological digs have discovered prehistoric objects and bones.

Population

See also
 Communes of the Doubs department

References

External links

 Santoche on the regional Web site 

Former communes of Doubs